The 1997 ASB Classic was a tennis tournament played on outdoor hard courts at the ASB Tennis Centre in Auckland in New Zealand that was part of Tier IV of the 1997 WTA Tour. The tournament was held from 30 December 1996 until 5 January 1997. Qualifier Marion Maruska won the singles title.

Finals

Singles

 Marion Maruska defeated  Judith Wiesner 6–3, 6–1
 It was Maruska's only title of the year and the 1st of her career.

Doubles

 Janette Husárová /  Dominique Van Roost defeated  Aleksandra Olsza /  Elena Wagner 6–2, 6–7, 6–3
 It was Husárová's only title of the year and the 3rd of her career. It was Van Roost's 1st title of the year and the 3rd of her career.

See also
 1997 BellSouth Open – men's tournament

References

External links
 ITF tournament edition details

ASB Classic
WTA Auckland Open
AM
January 1997 sports events in New Zealand
December 1996 sports events in New Zealand
1997 in New Zealand tennis